Kandari is a census town in Jalgaon district in the Indian state of Maharashtra.

Demographics
 India census, Kandari had a population of 15,192. Males constitute 53% of the population and females 47%. Kandari has an average literacy rate of 79%, higher than the national average of 59.5%: male literacy is 85%, and female literacy is 73%. In Kandari, 11% of the population is under 6 years

References

Cities and towns in Jalgaon district